Fernand Auberjonois (25 September 1910 – 27 August 2004) was a Swiss-American journalist who worked as the foreign correspondent of the Pittsburgh Post-Gazette and the Toledo Blade. Throughout most of the Cold War, Auberjonois was one of the most admired American reporters based in London. From 1956 until his formal retirement in 1983 and after, he covered many of the world's biggest news stories. During World War II, he enlisted in the U.S. and served on secret assignments, including setting up radio transmissions for the Allies to divert the German's attention from the real invasion site on D-Day. From World War II through the Cold War, he worked for many print organizations, and also for NBC and Voice of America.
    
Auberjonois was born in Valeyres-sous-Montagny, near Yverdon-les-Bains, Switzerland, the son of Augusta Grenier and René Auberjonois (1872–1957), one of Switzerland's best-known post-Impressionist painters. He married into European (Napoleonic) royalty, his wife being Princess Laure Louise Napoléone Eugénie Caroline Murat (Paris, 13 November 1913 – New York City, 10 May 1986), a descendant of Napoleon's sister Caroline and her husband Joachim Murat, who was King of Naples and King of Sicily. They married in November 1939 and had a son, actor René Auberjonois, was born in 1940.

He died on August 27, 2004, at the age of 93, of a heart attack.

Honours and awards
Chevalier of the Légion d'honneur (France)
Croix de guerre 1939–1945 with four palmes (France)
Legion of Merit (United States)
Polonia Restituta (Poland)

References

1910 births
2004 deaths
Swiss emigrants to the United States
Recipients of the Order of Polonia Restituta
Chevaliers of the Légion d'honneur
Recipients of the Croix de Guerre 1939–1945 (France)
Recipients of the Legion of Merit
Pittsburgh Post-Gazette people
20th-century American journalists
American male journalists